Derrty Entertainment is a record label founded by rapper Nelly who is the CEO. The president of the label is Ali. Derrty is a division of Motown. In recent years, the label has collaborated with So So Def, Star Trak and Sho'Nuff.

Fo' Reel Entertainment is record label distributed by Universal, also founded by Nelly that released albums and singles under the imprint between 2000 and 2010.

Roster

Current artists 
St. Lunatics
Nelly (CEO)
Ali (President)
Murphy Lee
City Spud
Kyjuan
Avery Storm
REZ
JGE Lil shxwn 
YAK BoyFresh

Former artists 
Kutt Calhoun
Big Gipp
King Jacob
Slyro Jenkins
Jung Tru
Prentiss Church
Chocolate Tai

DJs and producers 
DJ Trife (Nelly's personal DJ since he started his career)
Jayson "Koko" Bridges (produced the hit songs "Shake Ya Tailfeather" and "Over and Over")
Jason "Jay-E" Epperson (produced the hit songs "Country Grammar", "Work It", "E.I.", "Midwest Swing" and more songs for Nelly and The Lunatics)
Dorian "Doe" Moore (produced the hit singles "My Place" and "Tilt Ya Head Back")
Derrty DJs (list of DJs from St. Louis, including DJ C NOTE, DJ 618 and others)

Former Fo' Reel Entertainment artists 
 Penelope Jones (2000–2001)
 Farrah Franklin (2002–2003)
 Rashad (2003)
 Postaboy (2004)
 MisseZ (2006)
 Teairra Mari (2009-2010)

Other ventures
In 2003, Nelly launched the women's fashion brand Apple Bottoms with Yomi Martin, Nick Loftis, and Ian Kelly, including clothing, perfume and accessories.

Discography

See also
 Universal Records
 List of record labels

References

External links 
 

Record labels established in 2003
Hip hop record labels
American record labels
Vanity record labels
Labels distributed by Universal Music Group